Hum – I'm Because of Us is a 2018 Hindi web series created by Ekta Kapoor for her video on demand platform, ALTBalaji. It stars Kushal Tandon and Ridhima Pandit as protagonists and is directed by Partho Mitra. The series revolves around the bond between three sisters who, despite having different ideas about life, share a strong sisterly bond.

The series is available for streaming on the ALT Balaji app and associated websites.

Plot
The series revolves around three sisters Devina, Isha, and Sakshi who make their way to Mumbai to follow their dreams. Devina, the eldest sister, is sweet and simple and wants to hold the family together whereas Isha, the youngest sister, is smart and wants more from life. The series explores how their paths unravel as they develop their bonds as a family.

Cast
 Kushal Tandon as Rahul Nanda
 Ridhima Pandit as Devina Kapoor
 Karishma Sharma as Isha Kapoor
 Kanikka Kapur as Sakshi Kapoor 
 Payal Bhojwani as Young Sakshi Kapoor
 Payal Nair as Rooprani Kapoor
 Satyajit Sharma as Vikram Bedi
 Kasturi Maitra as Pammi Bedi
 Priyanka Panchal as Nishi Khanna
 Roma Navani as Rita Khanna
 Gulfam Khan as Joyce
Kunal Thakur as Gaurav Gill

List of episodes
 Episode 1: The Kapoor Girls
 Episode 2: Big City, Bigger Dreams, Bigger Everything
 Episode 3: Trouble in Paradise
 Episode 4: Dreams Do Come True
 Episode 5: Games People Play  
 Episode 6: The Proposal
 Episode 7: The Twist in the Fairy Tale
 Episode 8: Diamonds are a Girl's Best Friend
 Episode 9: Decision and Sacrifices
 Episode 10: The Game Must Go on
 Episode 11: Heart  vs foolishMind 
 Episode 12: The Day of the Wedding
 Episode 13: Love and lies
 Episode 14: Betrayal and Broken Dreams
 Episode 15: The Separation 
 Episode 16: A Night to Remember
 Episode 17: Hopes and Dreams never come true
 Episode 18: Money, Love and Broken Relationships
 Episode 19: A Day We Couldn't Forget 
 Episode 20: Season Finale: Guilt and Revenge

References

External links
 Watch Hum – I'm Because of Us on ALT Balaji website

2018 web series debuts
Hindi-language web series
ALTBalaji original programming
Indian drama web series